Federalist No. 74 is an essay by Alexander Hamilton, the seventy-fourth of The Federalist Papers. It was published on March 25, 1788, under the pseudonym Publius, the name under which all The Federalist papers were published. Its title is "The Command of the Military and Naval Forces, and the Pardoning Power of the Executive", and it is the eighth in a series of 11 essays discussing the powers and limitations of the Executive branch.

In this paper, Hamilton justifies the President's status as the commander of the militia, as well as the President's power to grant pardons.

See also
Federal pardons in the United States

External links 

 Text of The Federalist No. 74: congress.gov

74
1788 in American law
1788 essays
1788 in the United States